Ngô Du (1926–1977) was a general in the Army of the Republic of Vietnam (ARVN). 

A Catholic from Qui Nhơn and the son of a government official, he was educated at a French Catholic boys' school in Huế. He held few combat commands and had few connections with the South Vietnamese political elite. Du held low-key planning positions on the ARVN Joint General Staff until he was propelled into the role of acting commander of the IV Corps Tactical Zone upon the accidental death of Brigadier General Nguyen Viet Thanh in 1970. In August 1970, however, Du found himself promoted to command of the II Corps Tactical Zone in the Central Highlands of South Vietnam. 

During July 1971 allegations were raised in the US Congress that Du was deeply involved in the drug trade. Du's senior U.S. advisor, John Paul Vann acknowledged forthrightly that Du was corrupt and that, whatever his interest in drugs, his lifestyle far exceeded his legal income. Yet he was, said Vann, so amenable to American instruction that, to maintain respect for him within the ARVN, his American advisers had even on occasion warned him to be more independent. On that account, said Vann, "Despite some obvious shortcomings, I would rate Ngo Dzu as second ... [among] the eight corps commanders I have worked with." With Vann's rejoinder on record, the US dropped the issue and never pursued the allegations against Du.

From his headquarters at Pleiku, he and Vann, commanded ARVN forces during the North Vietnamese Easter Offensive of 1972. His command abilities during the ensuing fighting, according to his American advisors, left quite a lot to be desired. On 10 May 1972 he was replaced as corps commander by Major General Nguyễn Văn Toàn. Commenting on his replacement Vann said "All distant critics like to see a scalp fall, it makes them feel better. I am aware of criticism by members of the National Assembly from Binhdinh and Kontum Provinces of General Dzu's handling of the situation." Commenting on Toàn, Vann said "He'll either be better or worse than General Dzu or maybe similar."

Du escaped from Saigon in 1975. He died in California on February 14, 1977, at age 52.

Notes

References
Andrade, Dale, Trial by Fire: The 1972 Easter offensive, America's Last Vietnam Battle. New York: Hippocrene, 1995.

External links
The Dzu Story
Another Top General Fired by Thieu

1926 births
1977 deaths
Army of the Republic of Vietnam generals